The electric-field integral equation is a relationship that allows the calculation of an electric field (E) generated by an electric current distribution (J).

Derivation
When all quantities in the frequency domain are considered, a time-dependency  that is suppressed throughout is assumed.

Beginning with the Maxwell equations relating the electric and magnetic field, and assuming a linear, homogeneous media with permeability  and permittivity :

Following the third equation involving the divergence of H

by vector calculus we can write any divergenceless vector as the curl of another vector, hence

where A is called the magnetic vector potential. Substituting this into the above we get

and any curl-free vector can be written as the gradient of a scalar, hence

where  is the electric scalar potential. These relationships now allow us to write

where , which can be rewritten by vector identity as

As we have only specified the curl of A, we are free to define the divergence, and choose the following:

which is called the Lorenz gauge condition. The previous expression for A now reduces to

which is the vector Helmholtz equation. The solution of this equation for A is

where  is the three-dimensional homogeneous Green's function given by

We can now write what is called the electric field integral equation (EFIE), relating the electric field E to the vector potential A

We can further represent the EFIE in the dyadic form as

where  here is the dyadic homogeneous Green's Function given by

Interpretation

The EFIE describes a radiated field E given a set of sources J, and as such it is the fundamental equation used in antenna analysis and design. It is a very general relationship that can be used to compute the radiated field of any sort of antenna once the current distribution on it is known. The most important aspect of the EFIE is that it allows us to solve the radiation/scattering problem in an unbounded region, or one whose boundary is located at infinity.  For closed surfaces, it is possible to use the Magnetic Field Integral Equation or the Combined Field Integral Equation, both of which result in a set of equations with improved condition number compared to the EFIE.  However, the MFIE and CFIE can still contain resonances.

In scattering problems, it is desirable to determine an unknown scattered field  that is due to a known incident field . Unfortunately, the EFIE relates the scattered field to J, not the incident field, so we do not know what J is. Once this has been done, the integral equation can then be solved by a numerical technique appropriate to integral equations such as the method of moments.

Notes

By the Helmholtz theorem a vector field is described completely by its divergence and curl. As the divergence was not defined, we are justified by choosing the Lorenz Gauge condition above provided that we consistently use this definition of the divergence of A in all subsequent analysis.

It is natural to think that if a quantity exhibits this degree of freedom in its choice, then it should not be interpreted as a real physical quantity. After all, if we can freely choose  to be anything, then  is not unique. One may ask: what is the "true" value of  measured in an experiment?

Nevertheless, even in the Aharonov–Bohm experiment, the divergence  never enters the calculations; only  along the path of the particle determines the measurable effect.

References
Gibson, Walton C. The Method of Moments in Electromagnetics. Chapman & Hall/CRC, 2008. 
Harrington, Roger F. Time-Harmonic Electromagnetic Fields. McGraw-Hill, Inc., 1961. .
Balanis, Constantine A. Advanced Engineering Electromagnetics. Wiley, 1989. .
Chew, Weng C. Waves and Fields in Inhomogeneous Media. IEEE Press, 1995. .
Rao, Wilton, Glisson. Electromagnetic Scattering by Surfaces of Arbitrary Shape. IEEE Transactions on Antennas and Propagation, vol, AP-30, No. 3, May 1982. doi:10.1109/TAP.1982.1142818

Electromagnetism
Integral equations